My Name Is Michael Sibley is a 1952 mystery thriller novel by the British writer John Bingham, his debut.

Michael Sibley is suspected by the police of murdering John Prosset who had known since schooldays, and with whom he had a complex relationship

References

Bibliography
 West, Nigel. The A to Z of British Intelligence. Scarecrow Press, 2009.

1952 British novels
British thriller novels
Novels by John Bingham
Novels set in England
Victor Gollancz Ltd books